Lucas Ariel Rodríguez (born 27 April 1997) is an Argentine professional footballer who plays as a winger or an attacking midfielder for Liga MX club Tijuana.

Club career

Estudiantes 
Rodríguez is a youth exponent from Estudiantes. On 11 July 2015, he made his first-team debut in a league game against San Martín de San Juan in a 0–0 home draw. He replaced Carlos Auzqui after 78 minutes.

Loan to D.C. United 
On 31 December 2018, Rodríguez signed with MLS side D.C. United on a one year loan. He scored his first goal for DC against Real Salt Lake on March 16, 2019. He was known to be consistent and was a usual starter. In his 2019 MLS regular season, he played 33 games, scored 6 goals, and contributed 3 assists. In Round 1 of the 2019 MLS Cup Playoffs, Rodríguez scored a stoppage time equalizer against Toronto FC to extend the game into extra time. D.C. would go on to lose the game 1–5, ending their 2019 season. After Rodríguez's loan expired, D.C. negotiated for his return, but were unable to permanently sign Rodríguez from Estudiantes.

Tijuana 
On 20 June 2021, Rodríguez joined Liga MX club, Tijuana.

International career 
Rodríguez previously played for the Argentina national U-17 football team. On September 25, 2019, Rodríguez was called up to the Argentina national under-23 football team for friendlies against Mexico on October 9 and October 14.

References

1997 births
Living people
Argentine footballers
Argentine expatriate footballers
Association football wingers
Association football midfielders
Boca Juniors footballers
Estudiantes de La Plata footballers
D.C. United players
Club Tijuana footballers
Argentine Primera División players
Designated Players (MLS)
Major League Soccer players
Liga MX players
Argentine expatriate sportspeople in the United States
Argentine expatriate sportspeople in Mexico
Expatriate soccer players in the United States
Expatriate footballers in Mexico
Footballers from Buenos Aires